Eagle Landing State Park is a public recreation area occupying  on the west bank of the Connecticut River in the town of Haddam, Connecticut. The state park has facilities for picnicking, fishing, bird watching and car-top boating. A private concessionnaire offers river excursions from a dock in the park.

History
While the population of bald eagles in the park was reduced to practically nothing in the 1950s, it has since increased.
The site was acquired by the state in 2003 for $1.3 million. An attempt to exchange the land for a larger forested parcel owned by a development firm elsewhere in the town was abandoned in 2012.

References

External links
Eagle Landing State Park Connecticut Department of Energy and Environmental Protection
Eagle Landing State Park Map Connecticut Department of Energy and Environmental Protection

State parks of Connecticut
Parks in Middlesex County, Connecticut
Protected areas established in 2003
2003 establishments in Connecticut
Haddam, Connecticut